Blue Hawaii is a 1961 American musical romantic comedy-drama film directed by Norman Taurog and starring Elvis Presley. The screenplay by Hal Kanter was nominated by the Writers Guild of America in 1962 in the category of Best Written American Musical. The film opened at number two in box office receipts for that week and, despite mixed reviews from critics, finished as the 10th top-grossing film of 1961 and 14th for 1962 on the Variety national box office survey, earning $5 million. The film won a fourth place prize Laurel Award in the category of Top Musical of 1961.

Plot
Having been released from the Army, Chadwick "Chad" Gates is eager to return to Hawaii with his surfboard, his native Hawaiian beach friends, and his mixed-race girlfriend Maile Duval. His mother, Sarah Lee, wants him to follow in his father's footsteps and take over management at the Great Southern Hawaiian Fruit Company, the family business, but Chad is reluctant and goes to work as a tour guide at his girlfriend's agency. His slightly scatter-brained boss is Mr. Chapman.

The first clients Chad has are an attractive school teacher, Abigail Prentice, and four teenage female students. One of the students, 17-year-old Ellie Corbett, is portrayed as a self-centered young woman who doesn't get along with the other three in her group, but still becomes smitten with Chad. Chad's girlfriend, Maile, becomes jealous of the teacher who is quite fond of Chad. After Ellie's flirtatious ways with another tourist cause a wild fight to erupt in a restaurant, Chad is fired from his position as tour guide by Mr. Chapman. Maile quits her job in protest. Maile and Chad independently continue providing tourist activities to Abigail and the four youths, including Hawaiian-themed cookouts with live native music, parties, boating, horseback riding on Kauai, and a visit to a pineapple plantation.   

One night Ellie attempts to seduce Chad in his hotel room, but he refuses her advances, at the same moment that Maile pays a surprise visit to the hotel. Ellie despondently flees in a stolen jeep with the intent to commit suicide. Before Ellie can drown herself, Chad pulls her out from the shore and first attempts to speak to her but then decides to punish Ellie by forcing her in a spanking. In the following scene the girls, including Ellie, are having breakfast. Ellie is now pleasant, friendly and well mannered, and jokes about the "spanking" the previous night. Meanwhile, Abigail has found romance with Jack Kelman, a long-time business partner in Chad's father's pineapple company. With Jack's help, Chad and his father resolve their differences about Chad's future.

Chad and Maile form their own tourism business—Gates of Hawaii—and begin arrangements to provide tourist services for his father's large network of fruit salesmen in the continental United States and Canada. The film ends with Chad and Maile's lavish outdoor Hawaii wedding ceremony.

Cast

 Elvis Presley as Chadwick "Chad" Gates
 Joan Blackman as Maile Duval
 Angela Lansbury as Sarah Lee Gates
 Nancy Walters as Abigail Prentice
 Roland Winters as Fred Gates
 John Archer as Jack Kelman
 Howard McNear as Mr. Chapman
 Steve Brodie as Tucker Garvey
 Darlene Tompkins as Patsy Simon
 Iris Adrian as Enid Garvey
 Hilo Hattie as Waihila
 Jenny Maxwell as Ellie Corbett
 Pamela Austin as Selena "Sandy" Emerson (as Pamela Kirk)
 Christian Kay as Beverly Martin
 Lani Kai as Carl Tanami
 Jose De Vega as Ernie Gordon
 Frank Atienza as Ito O'Hara
 Tiki Hanalei as Ping Pong

Production
Blue Hawaii was the first of three Elvis films to be shot in Hawaii, followed by Girls! Girls! Girls! in 1962 and Paradise, Hawaiian Style in 1965. Producer Hal B. Wallis was keen to put Presley into a film that showed how the army affected a man. Actress Juliet Prowse, who had starred with Presley in GI Blues, was approached to be his love interest again. However, after her demands were put forward, Paramount decided to drop her as a possible candidate for the role, choosing Joan Blackman instead. Presley was apparently so pale before shooting that Wallis personally recommended a brand of tanning lamp to darken his skin. The film was announced in the fall of 1960 as Hawaii Beach Boy. At the time, film producer Walter Mirisch had a similar titled film in production, "Hawaii", and he was upset that Wallis had chosen such a similar name.

Presley arrived in Hawaii on March 18, 1961, to prepare for a charity concert that he was performing on March 25 to raise funds for the Arizona Memorial at Pearl Harbor. He arrived at the recording studio on March 21 to start the recording of the film's soundtrack. Three weeks later, location filming had finished, including scenes at Waikiki Beach, Diamond Head, Mount Tantalus, and Hanauma Bay, a volcanic crater that is open to the sea, near the bedroom community of Hawaii Kai, a few miles away from Waikiki. Following location filming, the crew returned to the Paramount lot to finish other scenes for the film. Presley would relax during filming by giving karate demonstrations with his friend and employee, Red West, which resulted in Presley's fingers becoming bruised and swollen. Wallis warned the female stars of the film to avoid parties hosted by Presley because they were turning up for shooting looking tired.

Producer Hal Wallis would use the box office returns from Blue Hawaii to finance an upcoming Wallis film, 1964's Becket, starring Richard Burton and Peter O'Toole.

Presley was 26 at the time this film was released, and a not yet 36-year-old Angela Lansbury played his character's mother. Nancy Walters, who was cast as the older school teacher was, in reality, only 18 months older than Presley.

Much of the film was shot on location at the Coco Palms Resort on the east coast of Kauai. The resort was abandoned after Hurricane Iniki in 1992.

Although it is mentioned in the film that Chad's parents live in Kāhala, one of the most expensive and exclusive areas of Honolulu in 1961, the view from their "lanai" (porch or terrace) shows Diamond Head as it appears from Waikiki and downtown Honolulu. In actuality, Kāhala is located on the other side of Diamond Head from Waikiki.

There were several scenes filmed in and around the famous Waikiki Beach, including the opening driving scenes, as well as the office scene across the street from the "International Market". The scenes in which Chad's clients stayed in a hotel and in which he picked up his tour group – as well as those on the beach where he spent time with his girlfriend – were all filmed on the property that is now known as the Hilton Hawaiian Village on Waikiki Beach.

Reception
Howard Thompson of The New York Times called the film "blandly uneventful" with a "nonsensical and harmless" plot, though he wrote that Presley "delivers the songs and rhythmical spasms right on schedule. We counted fourteen tunes, about half of them replete with ukulele trimmings and exotic, weaving dancers. One of them, a number called 'Beach Boy Blues,' is nifty, and Presley delivers it accordingly. No kidding." Variety wrote, "Hal Kanter's breezy screenplay, from a story by Allan Weiss, is the slim, but convenient, foundation around which Wallis and staff have erected a handsome, picture-postcard production crammed with typical South Seas musical hulaballoo ... Under Norman Taurog's broad direction, Presley, in essence, is playing himself—a role sure to delight his ardent fans." Harrison's Reports graded the film as "Fair", adding, "As is the custom in a Presley production, the crooner-gyrater dominates the running time of the film. That is why, it is more the pity, now that he has so many films under his acting belt that he still continues to deliver such an embarrassingly poor performance." John L. Scott of the Los Angeles Times wrote that the film "does a lot for the 'paradise of the Pacific,' showing its foamy waves, palm trees, luaus and a couple of plush hotels, but not very much for Elvis' fans (what age bracket does he appeal to now?) ... One of these days Elvis will play a straight role with substance, and we'll definitely find out whether he can act or not."

Accolades
The film is recognized by American Film Institute in these lists:
 2004: AFI's 100 Years...100 Songs:	
 "Blue Hawaii" – Nominated

Soundtrack

Presley's remake of the title song introduced it to an audience too young to remember Bing Crosby's original hit version.

The soundtrack album was on the Billboard Pop Albums chart for 79 weeks, where it spent 20 weeks at #1. It has been certified by the RIAA for sales of three million copies in the U.S.

The soundtrack album was nominated for a Grammy Award in 1961 in the category of Best Sound Track Album or Recording of Original Cast from a Motion Picture or Television.

The soundtrack featured the hit song "Can't Help Falling in Love" sung by Elvis, which is certified Platinum by the RIAA, for U.S. sales in excess of one million copies. The song peaked at No. 2 on the U.S. Billboard Billboard Hot 100 and Hit No. 1 on the Adult Contemporary chart for six weeks as well as topping the British Charts in 1962.

See also
 List of American films of 1961

References

External links
 
 
 
 
 Elvis in Hawaii Presley's movies in Hawaii
 Review of the movie collection "Lights! Camera! Elvis! Collection" (including Blue Hawaii)

1961 films
1961 musical comedy films
1961 romantic comedy films
American musical comedy films
American romantic comedy films
American romantic musical films
Tiki culture
Films directed by Norman Taurog
Films set in Hawaii
Films shot in Honolulu
Paramount Pictures films
Films set on beaches
Films produced by Hal B. Wallis
1960s English-language films
1960s American films